Jacques Bar (12 September 1921, Châteauroux – 19 January 2009,  Boulogne-Billancourt) was a French film producer who made more than 80 films.

Select credits

 Branquignol (1949)
 My Seal and Them (1951)
 The Adventures of Mandrin (1952)
 The Man in My Life (1952)
 Crazy for Love (1952)
 I Vitelloni (1953)
 The Slave (1953)
 House of Ricordi (1954)
 Spring, Autumn and Love (1955)
 Typhoon Over Nagasaki (1957)
Bridge to the Sun (1961)
Any Number Can Win (1962)
 The Gentleman from Epsom (1962)
The Day and the Hour (1963)
 Rififi in Tokyo (1963) 
Joy House (1964)
 The Dictator's Guns (1965)
 The Suspects (1974)
My Father, the Hero (1991)
The Count of Monte Cristo (1998)

References

External links

Jacques Bar at TCMDB

French film producers
1921 births
2009 deaths
People from Châteauroux